Patrick Modiano (born 1945) is a French novelist, recipient of the Nobel Prize in Literature.

Modiano may also refer to:
 Modiano (company), Italian manufacturer of cigarette papers and playing cards

People with the surname
 Eli Modiano (1881-1968), Italian-Jewish architect in Thessaloniki, Greece
 Modiano Market, an enclosed market in Thessaloniki, Greece
 Villa Modiano, today the Folklife and Ethnological Museum of Macedonia and Thrace
 Eytan Modiano, American engineer
  (1899-1943), Italian typographer and art critic
  (1932-2020), French politician, son of Vidal Modiano
 M. Modiano, creator of Modiano's model of English, a model of international use of English
  (1914-1993), Italian entrepreneur and politician
 Marie Modiano (born 1978), French singer and writer and daughter of Patrick Modiano
 Natty (British singer) (born Alexander Modiano in 1983), British reggae artist
 Samuel a.k.a.  (born 1930), Italian deportee and Holocaust witness
  (born 1959), Swiss writer and educator
 Sara Modiano (1951–2010), Colombian artist
 Umberto Modiano, Brazilian businessman who financially supported the 1989 emancipation movement of Armação dos Búzios
 Umberto Modiano Airport, in Armação dos Búzios, Brazil
 , (1888–1971), president of the Conseil Représentatif des Institutions juives de France, father of Henri Modiano
  (born 1974), French film director, daughter of Patrick Modiano

See also
Modigliani (disambiguation)

Italian-language surnames
Jewish surnames
Sephardic surnames